The Beaver Dam Bridge was a bridge along the York River in Quebec, Canada. The bridge was situated on  Quebec Route 198 and connected the Quebecois municipalities of Murdochville and Gaspé. The bridge collapsed on May 22, 1963, due to flood damage and killed 6 people, all mine workers heading toward Murdochville.

Tragedy 

On May 22, 1963, a pillar of the Beaver Dam Bridge was knocked down and swept away by flood waters early in the morning. Six cars who weren't aware of the pillar collapse plunged into the York River, banging hard on the bridge's concrete in the process, which killed the occupants. A car containing four people that plunged into the river floated 800 meters down the York River before the people in the car were able to escape and warn incoming traffic of the bridge's collapse, preventing further deaths.

References 

Bridges in Quebec
Road bridges in Quebec